Postosuchus, meaning "Crocodile from  Post", is an extinct genus of rauisuchid reptiles comprising two species, P. kirkpatricki and P. alisonae, that lived in what is now North America during the Late Triassic. Postosuchus is a member of the clade Pseudosuchia, the lineage of archosaurs that includes modern crocodilians (the other main group of archosaurs is Avemetatarsalia, the lineage that includes non-avian dinosaurs and their descendants, birds). Its name refers to Post Quarry, a place in Texas where many fossils of the type species, P. kirkpatricki, were found. It was one of the apex predators of its area during the Triassic, larger than the small dinosaur predators of its time (such as Coelophysis). It was a hunter which probably preyed on large bulky herbivores like dicynodonts and many other creatures smaller than itself (such as early dinosaurs).

The skeleton of Postosuchus is large and robust with a deep skull and a long tail. The extreme shortness of the forelimbs relative to the hind limbs, the very small hands, and measurements of the vertebrae suggest that Postosuchus may have been committed to bipedal locomotion.

Description
 
Postosuchus was one of the largest carnivorous reptiles during the late Triassic. It had a massively built skull bearing dagger-like teeth. The neck was elongated, expanding to a short torso and long tail. Along with remains of the skeleton, paleontologists also identify osteoderms, which were thick plates forming scales. These were on its back, neck, and possibly above or under the tail.

The neck of Postosuchus consists of at least eight cervical vertebrae followed by sixteen dorsals, while four co-ossified sacral vertebrae supported the hips. It is thought to be over thirty vertebrae in the tail decreasing in size to the end. The pelvis with the hooked pubis and the rod-like ischium looked like those of carnosaur dinosaurs. The ribcage of Postosuchus had typical archosaur structure, composed of large and slender, curved ribs. In some discoveries ribs were found associated with gastralia, dermal bones located in the ventral region of the body.

Skull

The skull of Postosuchus was constructed narrow in front and extended wide and deep behind. It was 55 cm in length and 21 cm broad and deep. There are many fenestrae (openings) present in the bones that lighten the skull, providing space for the muscles. Like more derived archosaurs, the lower jaw had mandibular fenestrae (openings at the lower jaw), formed by the junction of the dentary with other jaw bones (surangular and angular). Postosuchus had very good long distant sight, due to large orbits, supporting large and sharp eyes, and strong olfaction provided by elongated nostrils. Inside the skull, under the nostrils, there was a hollow that may have contained the Jacobson's organ, an olfactory sensory organ sometimes referred as the "sixth sense". The jaws held large and sharp serrated teeth, of which some were developed even larger to operate as hooked sabers. A complete tooth found among Postosuchus remains in North Carolina measured about 7.2 cm in height. Postosuchus possessed heterodonty dentition, which means each tooth was different in size and shape from the others. The upper jaw contained seventeen teeth, with each premaxilla bearing only four teeth and each maxilla thirteen teeth. In the lower jaw were over thirty teeth. Replacement activity in Postosuchus was different from that of crocodiles, since the replacement tooth didn't fit directly in the pulp cavity of the old tooth, but grew until resorption of the old tooth was complete.

Limbs and posture
With the forelimbs being approximately 64% of the hindlimbs, Postosuchus had small hands bearing five toes. Only the first toe bore a large claw, which was used as an offensive weapon, and the forelimbs were robust, probably to hold the prey. The feet were much larger than the hands, with the fifth metatarsal forming a hook shape. The halluxes were slenderer than the other toes and the marginal ones could not touch the ground. Being a crurotarsan, the heel and ankle of Postosuchus resemble those of modern crocodiles.
 
The limbs were located underneath the body giving Postosuchus an upright stance. Historically, there has been debate over whether or not rauisuchids like Postosuchus were mainly bipedal or quadrupedal. Each one of Postosuchus'''s two forelimbs was slightly over half the size of the hindlimbs. This characteristic of short forelimbs can usually be seen in bipedal reptiles. Chatterjee suggested that Postosuchus could walk in an erect stance, since the short forelimbs were probably used only during slow locomotion. In 1995 Robert Long and Phillip A. Murry argued that Postosuchus was heavily built and quadrupedal. Peyer et al. 2008, argued that the thick pectoral girdle served for locomotion of the forelimbs. They noted that this does not, however, detract from the theory that Postosuchus could also walk bipedally. In 2013, a major study of the skeletal structure concluded that Postosuchus may have been an obligate biped based on evidence from the anatomy of the digits, vertebrae, and pelvis. The proportions of the limbs and weight-bearing sections of the spine were very similar to many theropod dinosaurs, nearly all of which are thought to have been strictly bipedal.

History

During an expedition in 1980, paleontologists of the Texas Tech University discovered a new geological site rich in fossils near Post, Garza County, Texas, US, where a dozen well-preserved specimens belonging to a new rauisuchid were found. In the following years further excavation in the Post Quarry, in Cooper Canyon Formation (Dockum Group), unearthed many remains of late Triassic terrestrial fauna. The holotype of P. kirkpatricki (TTUP 9000), representing a well-preserved skull and a partial postcranial skeleton, was described along with other findings of this new genus by paleontologist Sankar Chatterjee in 1985. A paratype, TTU-P 9002, representing a well-preserved skull and a complete skeleton was also assigned to this species. Chatterjee named the species after Mr. and Mrs. Jack Kirkpatrick who helped during his fieldwork. Subsequently, some specimens (such manus and toe bones) were re-assigned to Chatterjeea and Lythrosuchus; Long and Murry pointed out that many of the juvenile skeletons (TTUP 9003-9011), which Chatterjee assigned to P. kirkpatricki, belong to a distinct genus, named Chatterjeea elegans. Furthermore, in 2006 Nesbitt and Norell argued that Chatterjeea is a junior synonym of Shuvosaurus.

In 2008, Peyer et al., described a new species of Postosuchus, P. alisonae that was discovered by two UNC undergrad students, Brian Coffey and Marco Brewer in 1992 in Triangle Brick Co. Quarry, Durham County, North Carolina. The remains were prepared and reconstructed between 1994 and 1998 by the Department of Geological Sciences at the University of North Carolina. The specific name is in reference to Alison L. Chambers, who worked to popularize paleontology in North Carolina. The skeleton of P. alisonae consists of a few cranial bones, seven neck, one back, and four tail vertebrae, ribs, gastralia ("belly ribs"), chevrons, bony scutes, much of the shoulder girdles, most of the forelimbs except the left wrist and hand, most of the hindlimbs except for the thigh bones, and pieces from the hip. Moreover, the well-preserved remains of P. alisonae shed new light on parts of Postosuchus anatomy, which were previously not well known. Specifically, the differences between the manus bones of P. kirkpatricki and P. alisonae confirm the chimera theory (associated fossils belonging to different animals) suggested by Long and Murry. The holotype specimen of P. alisonae (UNC 15575) is also unusual in its preservation of gut contents: bones from at least four other animals, including a partial skeleton of an aetosaur, a snout, coracoid, and humerus of the traversodontid cynodont Plinthogomphodon, two phalanges from a dicynodont, and a possible temnospondyl bone. Furthermore, the Postosuchus was positioned on top of a skeleton of the sphenosuchian Dromicosuchus, which included tooth marks on the skull and neck. P. alisonae represents the largest suchian reptile recovered from the quarry and the first articulated specimen of 'rauisuchian' archosaur found in eastern North America.

Putative occurrences
Specimens similar to Postosuchus were discovered in Crosby County, Texas in 1920, and described by paleontologist Ermine Cowles Case in 1922.Case (1922), pp. 70–74. The fossils were composed only of an isolated braincase (UM 7473) and fragments of pelvic bones (UM 7244). Case then mistakenly assigned these specimens to the dinosaur genus Coelophysis. In the case of the braincase later assigned to Postosuchus, in 2002 paleontologist David J. Gower argued that the specimen is not complete and may belong to an ornithodire. Between 1932 and 1934, Case discovered other fossils of caudal vertebrae (UMMP 13670) in Rotten Hill, Texas, and a complete pelvis (UCMP V72183/113314) near Kalgary, Texas. Within the same period, paleontologist Charles Lewis Camp collected over a hundred "rauisuchian" bones, from what is now the Petrified Forest National Park of Arizona, which belong to at least seven individuals (UCMP A296, MNA 207C). Later, more remains came to light. In 1943, Case again described a pelvis along with a pubis (UM 23127) from the Dockum Group of Texas, which dates from the Carnian through the early Norian stages of Late Triassic period. These early findings, from 1932 to 1943, were initially referred to as a new phytosaur reptile, but assigned forty years later to Postosuchus.

The first articulated skeleton referred to P. kirkpatricki (CM 73372) was recovered by David S. Berman of the Carnegie Museum of Natural History, in Coelophysis Quarry at Ghost Ranch, New Mexico, between 1988 and 1989. This specimen was composed of a well-preserved skeleton without skull and was described by Long and Murry in 1995, Weinbaum in 2002 and Novak in 2004.Weinbaum (2002), 78 pp. The specimen represents a skeletally immature individual because none of the neural sutures are closed. It was referred to P. kirkpatricki by Long and Murry (1995) without specific justification, and more recent studies accepted this referral. Nevertheless, Nesbitt (2011) noted that these studies failed to note any synapomorphies unique to P. kirkpatricki and CM 73372. Weinbaum (2002) and Novak (2004) even noted that the preacetabular process of the ilium in CM 73372 was much longer than that of P. kirkpatricki. Nesbitt (2011) also noted that CM 73372 differs from P. kirkpatricki and Rauisuchus in possessing a concave ventral margin of the ilium, and from P. alisonae in processing an asymmetrical distal end of the fourth metatarsal. Nesbitt (2011) couldn't differentiate CM 73372 and Polonosuchus as they overlap only in the caudal vertebrae. A phylogenetic analysis conducted by Nesbitt (2011), one of the most extensive on archosaurs, found CM 73372 to be the most basal crocodylomorph, thus referable neither to P. kirkpatricki nor to Rauisuchidae.

In their description of Vivaron, Lessner et al. (2016) questioned the random referral of all rauisuchid material from the southwestern US to Postosuchus, saying that the discovery of Vivaron stresses the need for a re-appraisal of all material from localities younger or older than unequivocal remains of Postosuchus and Vivaron.

PaleoecologyPostosuchus lived in a tropical environment.Chatterjee (1985), p. 433. The moist and warm region consisted of ferns, such as Cynepteris, Phelopteris and Clathropteris, gymnosperms, represented by Pelourdea, Araucarioxylon, Woodworthia, Otozamites and Dinophyton, and cycads like Sanmiguelia.Ash (1976), pp. 799–804. Plants of the Dockum Group are not well known since the oxidizing of the environment has destroyed most of the plant fossils. Some of them may, however, provide information about the climate in Dockum Group during the late Triassic period. For example, the discovery of large specimens belonging to Araucarioxylon determine that the region was well watered.Ash (1972), pp. 124–128. The fauna found in Dockum Group confirm that there were lakes and/or rivers containing fish such as the cartilaginous Xenacanthus, the lobe-finned Chinlea and the dipnoan Ceratodus. On the shores of these rivers lived labyrinthodonts (Latiscopus) and reptiles such as Malerisaurus and Trilophosaurus. Also living on the margins of the lakes were the archosaurs Leptosuchus, Nicrosaurus and Rutiodon and the dicynodont Placerias. Postosuchus lived in the uplands along with Coelophysis and other archosaurs such as Desmatosuchus and Typothorax. Postosuchus was one of the largest animals in that ecosystem and preyed on herbivores such as Trilophosaurus, Typothorax and Placerias''.

Notes

References

External links

 Postosuchus at Palaeos.com
 Postosuchus at Dinosaurs Alive!

Rauisuchids
Late Triassic archosaurs of North America
Chinle fauna
Fossil taxa described in 1985
Taxa named by Sankar Chatterjee
Late Triassic pseudosuchians
Paleontology in Texas
Prehistoric pseudosuchian genera